Count Svensson (Swedish: Greve Svensson) is a 1951 Swedish comedy film directed by Emil A. Lingheim and starring Edvard Persson, Mim Persson and Barbro Hiort af Ornäs.

The film's sets were designed by the art director Arne Åkermark.

Main cast
 Edvard Persson as Anders Svensson  
 Mim Persson as Stina Svensson  
 Barbro Hiort af Ornäs as Greta Svensson  
 Ivar Wahlgren as Ville Lundgren  
 Bengt Logardt as Sven Lindström 
 Siv Thulin as Lisa Fransson  
 Toivo Pawlo as Leijonstedt  
 Hans Hugold von Schwerin as himself  
 Poul Juhl as 'Count' Nordencrone  
 Astrid Kraa as Trine  
 Ellen Jansø as Ilse, police woman  
 Carl Johan Hviid as Policeman

References

Bibliography 
 Qvist, Per Olov & von Bagh, Peter. Guide to the Cinema of Sweden and Finland. Greenwood Publishing Group, 2000.

External links 
 

1951 films
1951 comedy films
Swedish comedy films
1950s Swedish-language films
Films directed by Emil A. Lingheim
Swedish black-and-white films
1950s Swedish films